Kieran Egan may refer to:
Kieran Egan (politician) (1916–1976), Irish Fianna Fáil politician
Kieran Egan (philosopher) (1942–2022), English educational philosopher